Felton is a borough in York County, Pennsylvania, United States. The population was 501 at the 2020 census. The borough is located within the Red Lion Area School District. Local services include the Felton Fire Company and the Felton US Post Office. The current Mayor of Felton borough is Bryan T. McManus, Jr.

Geography
Felton is located at  (39.854751, -76.564245).

Demographics

As of the census of 2000, there were 449 people, 173 households, and 131 families living in the borough. The population density was 688.4 people per square mile (266.7/km2). There were 182 housing units at an average density of 279.1 per square mile (108.1/km2). The racial makeup of the borough was 98.44% White, 0.45% African American, 0.45% Asian, 0.67% from other races.

There were 173 households, out of which 31.2% had children under the age of 18 living with them, 68.8% were married couples living together, 5.8% had a female householder with no husband present, and 23.7% were non-families. 18.5% of all households were made up of individuals, and 5.8% had someone living alone who was 65 years of age or older. The average household size was 2.60 and the average family size was 2.98.

In the borough the population was spread out, with 21.2% under the age of 18, 9.6% from 18 to 24, 31.4% from 25 to 44, 26.7% from 45 to 64, and 11.1% who were 65 years of age or older. The median age was 40 years. For every 100 females there were 104.1 males. For every 100 females age 18 and over, there were 100.0 males.

The median income for a household in the borough was $42,353, and the median income for a family was $53,125. Males had a median income of $36,607 versus $22,679 for females. The per capita income for the borough was $19,322. About 4.1% of families and 5.7% of the population were below the poverty line, including 12.5% of those under age 18 and 6.6% of those age 65 or over.

References

Populated places established in 1899
Boroughs in York County, Pennsylvania
1899 establishments in Pennsylvania